Life's a Trip (stylized in all caps) is the debut studio album by American rapper Trippie Redd. It was released on August 10, 2018, by TenThousand Projects and Caroline Distribution. The album features guest appearances from Diplo, Young Thug, Reese Laflare, and Travis Scott. Production was handled by OZ, Murda Beatz, BeatPusher, Honorable C.N.O.T.E., Avedon, Diplo, Scott Storch, Wheezy, Boaz van de Beatz and WE ARE THE STARS, among others. The album cover was designed by Canadian artist Stephen Gibb. A sequel album titled Trip at Knight was released on August 20, 2021.

Background
In 2018, the album was announced, with the release date and cover artwork, which has unveiled on July 31, 2018.

Singles
The lead single, "Dark Knight Dummo", was released on December 6, 2017. The song features a guest appearance from American rapper Travis Scott, with production by Honorable C.N.O.T.E. The song peaked at number 72 on the US Billboard Hot 100, becoming Trippie Redd's first charting single. The song was certified Platinum by the Recording Industry Association of America (RIAA) on June 6, 2018.

Critical reception

Life's a Trip received a lukewarm response from critics. Charles Holmes of XXL described the album as "indulgent, polished and deeply personal", adding that "Vocally, his balance between restrained and bombastic delivery is unmatched." Scott Glaysher of HipHopDX praised the album's experimentation and genre-blending: "His young artistry shines through as he paints life pictures across all genres – not just with hi-hats and thundering 808s."

In a mixed review, Alphonse Pierre of Pitchfork noted monotony in the production and a lack of identity: "Life's a Trip is stuffed with forced production choices that impair Trippie's over-the-top voice from hitting all of its quirks. It's clear Trippie needs more time to develop his sound and iron out a direction that doesn't feel like a detour. A great Trippie Redd album is possible, but first he needs to destroy all of the guitars in his vicinity, block Diplo's cell, and use his voice and Soundcloud rooted style that got him here in the first place." Online hip hop publication HotNewHipHop wrote that Trippie Redd "proves his versatility, but often strays away from his strengths", straying away from a "promising formula" established on his previous releases.

Commercial performance
Life's a Trip debuted at number four on the US Billboard 200 with 72,000 album-equivalent units, including 15,000 pure album sales in its first week. On June 20, 2019, the album was gold by the Recording Industry Association of America (RIAA) for combined sales and album-equivalent units of over 500,000 units in the United States.

Track listing
Credits adapted from Tidal and Qobuz

Notes
  signifies a co-producer
  signifies an uncredited additional producer
 "Bang!" and “Uka Uka” are stylized in capital letters.
 "How You Feel" contains an interpolation of "Baby Hold On" by Eddie Money
 "Oomps Revenge" contains a sample of "In Just a Matter of Time" by The Gene Dunlap Band

Charts

Weekly charts

Year-end charts

Certifications

References

2018 debut albums
Caroline Records albums
Albums produced by Diplo
Albums produced by Honorable C.N.O.T.E.
Albums produced by Murda Beatz
Albums produced by Scott Storch
Trippie Redd albums
Pop punk albums by American artists